Tongzi opera, also known as Tong opera, is a regional form of Chinese opera popular in the rural areas of Nantong in southeastern Jiangsu province. It is traditionally sung in Nantong dialect and accompanied by gong and drum. The form resulted from the blending of a local religious activity called shang tongzi with theatre.

In 2008, it was included in the national intangible cultural heritage list.

History

Origins
Its history can be traced back to the pre-Qin period. 
Tongzi opera was born over 1000 years ago when Nantong was a piece of impact basin near the Yangzi River. At that time, economy and technology was not developed, the residents made a living by salt making and agriculture. Therefore, residents held Buddhist meetings every year to pray for good crop weather and bumper grain harvest which was called Shangtongzi. Thereafter more than 1000 years, it mixed together with the local dialect, the culture, the custom and the public sentiment which contributed to the embryonic form of Tongzi opera. In the end of the Qing Dynasty, performers modified the lines, appeared on the stage with make-up, which contributed to its prototype. Formulated in Dongzhou and popular in the Tang Dynasty.

Development
After the founding of the People's Republic of China, performers went a step further to abandon some superstition contents, using its unique talking and singing form, adapted the Tongzi opera to modern opera, successfully transformed it into Nantong opera. After the reforming and opening up, some young performers were cultivated in the support of Nantong Culture Administration. With the rapid development of market economy, a number of folk performance teams sprang up. In recent years, the endangered Tongzi opera has received much more attention and concerns home and abroad. In 2008, it was included in the list of national intangible cultural heritage.

External links
 cnki.gzlib.gov.cn
 cnki.com.cn
 youku.com

References

Chinese opera
Culture in Nantong